Route 349 is collector road in the Canadian province of Nova Scotia.

It is located in the Halifax Regional Municipality and connects Armdale at the Armdale Traffic Circle with Sambro.

It runs on Herring Cove Road from Armdale to Herring Cove, the Ketch Harbour Road from Herring Cove to Sambro, and Old Sambro Road within Sambro to the highway's terminus at the end of Bull Point.

Communities
Armdale
Spryfield
Herring Cove
Portuguese Cove
Halibut Bay
Bear Cove
Duncan's Cove 
Ketch Harbour 
Sambro Head
Sambro

Parks
 Crystal Crescent Provincial Park

See also
List of Nova Scotia provincial highways

References

Nova Scotia provincial highways
Roads in Halifax, Nova Scotia